Events from the year 1958 in Romania. The year saw the end of the Soviet occupation of Romania with the last Soviet troops leaving the country.

Incumbents
President of the Provisional Presidium of the Republic:
Petru Groza  (until 7 January).
Ion Gheorghe Maurer (from 11 January).
Prime Minister: Chivu Stoica.
General Secretary of the Romanian Communist Party: Gheorghe Gheorghiu-Dej.

Events
 20 February – A Hungarian delegation, including János Kádár, visits Romania. They make explicit that Hungary has no territorial claims over Hungarian-speaking part of the country.
 27 May – Soviet Premier Nikita Khrushchev declares that Soviet troops will withdraw from Romania.
 6 June – The start of a three-day trial of four students who organised a conference to celebrate the 500th anniversary of the crowning of Stephen the Great. They are found guilty and imprisoned until 1964.
 21 July –  In response to the Hungarian Revolution of 1956, the Great National Assembly passes Decree 318, stating that contacting foreigners to declare Romania neutral carries the death penalty.
 25 July – The last Soviet troops leave Romania, ending the Soviet occupation.
 14 November – Romania establishes its first diplomatic relations at the embassy level with a sub-Saharan country, Guinea.
 Unknown – The last Csángós school is closed as part of the Romanianization of Western Moldavia.

Art and literature
 Ciulinii Bărăganului, a Franco-Romanian film directed by Louis Daquin and Gheorghe Vitanidis, based on a novel of the same title by Panait Istrati, was nominated for the Golden Palm award at the 1958 Cannes Film Festival.

Births
 10 February – Olga Homeghi, rower, gold medal winner at the 1984 and 1988 Summer Olympics.
 9 March – Cornelia Catangă, lăutari musician (died 2021).
 25 June – Gigi Becali, businessman and politician.
 29 June – Oana Lungescu, journalist and NATO principal spokesperson.
 4 July – Elena Horvat, rower, gold medal winner at the 1984 Summer Olympics.
 23 August – Iosif Matula, politician and member of the European Parliament.
 6 November – Elena Bondar, rower, bronze medal winner at the 1980 Summer Olympics.

Deaths
 7 January – Petru Groza, President since 1952 and Prime Minister between 1945 and 1952 (born 1884).
 17 February – Natalie Bierle, film actress who used the pseudonym Tala Birell (born 1907).
 26 May – Constantin Cantacuzino, aviator, the leading Romanian fighter ace in World War II (born 1905).
 24 August –Veronica Antal, professed member of the Secular Franciscan Order, the first Romanian woman to be beatified, on 22 September 2018 (born 1935).
 2 September – Iosif Capotă, physician who led a group of anti-communist resistance fighters, executed at Gherla Prison (born 1912).
 7 December – Constantin Brăiloiu, composer and ethnomusicologist (born 1893).

References

Years of the 20th century in Romania
1958 in Romania
Romania
Romania